Oxyurichthys uronema, commonly known as the longtail tentacle goby, is a species of goby found in Indonesia.

References

Randall, J.E. and K.K.P. Lim (eds.), 2000. A checklist of the fishes of the South China Sea. Raffles Bull. Zool. Suppl. (8):569-667.

uronema
Fish of the Pacific Ocean
Fish of Indonesia
Taxa named by Max Carl Wilhelm Weber
Fish described in 1909